Psycho-Pass is a Japanese anime television series produced by Production I.G, directed by Naoyoshi Shiotani, and written by Gen Urobuchi. The series aired from October 12, 2012 to March 22, 2013 on Fuji TV's Noitamina. Funimation has licensed the series in North America and simulcasted the series on their website.

On July 6, 2013, Production I.G. president Mitsuhisa Ishikawa said at Anime Expo that production on a second season had begun. Titled Psycho-Pass 2, the season was produced by Tatsunoko Production and directed by Kiyotaka Suzuki. It aired from October 10, 2014 to December 19, 2014.

On March 8, 2019, a third season was announced. The third season aired on Fuji TV's Noitamina programming block between October 24, 2019 and December 12, 2019, with a special program being aired on October 17, 2019. Amazon streamed the series inside and outside of Japan on their Amazon Prime Video service. Naoyoshi Shiotani returned as director, Akira Amano as character designer, and Production I.G. as animation producer. It consisted of eight episodes with each episode being 45 minutes long.

Series overview

Episode list

Psycho-Pass (2012–13)

Psycho-Pass 2 (2014)

Psycho-Pass 3 (2019)

References

Psycho-Pass